Sullivan Lake is a landslide-dammed mountain lake in Custer County, Idaho, United States, located at the northern end of the White Cloud Mountains in the Sawtooth National Recreation Area.  The lake is accessed from Sawtooth National Forest trail 677 from Idaho State Highway 75.

Sullivan Lake is just east of Potaman Peak and upstream of Sullivan Hot Springs.

References

See also
 List of lakes of the White Cloud Mountains
 Sawtooth National Recreation Area
 White Cloud Mountains

Lakes of Idaho
Lakes of Custer County, Idaho
Sawtooth National Forest
Landslide-dammed lakes